"Full of Fire" is a 1975 song written by Al Green, Mabon Hodges, Willie Mitchell and recorded  by Al Green. The single has a more up-tempo feel than his previous releases and was Green's last of six number ones on the R&B chart. "Full of Fire" also reached number twenty-eight on the Billboard Hot 100 singles chart.

Chart positions

References

1975 singles
Al Green songs
1975 songs
Songs written by Al Green
Songs written by Teenie Hodges
Songs written by Willie Mitchell (musician)